Labdia tribrachynta is a moth in the family Cosmopterigidae. It is found in India.

References

Natural History Museum Lepidoptera generic names catalog

Labdia
Moths described in 1928